The 1959–60 Serie C was the twenty-second edition of Serie C, the third highest league in the Italian football league system.

It was the first season ruled by present-day Lega Pro, at time the Semiprofessional League, and the first one under the new three tournament-format North, Centre and South.

Girone A

Final classification

Girone B

Final classification

Girone C

Final classification

References and sources
Almanacco Illustrato del Calcio - La Storia 1898-2004, Panini Edizioni, Modena, September 2005

Serie C seasons
3
Italy